David John Metchick (born 14 August 1943) is an English former professional footballer who played as a midfielder in England and the United States. In England, he played in the Football League for Leyton Orient, Brentford, Fulham, Peterborough United and Queens Park Rangers and in the United States he played in the North American Soccer League for Atlanta Apollos and Miami Gatos. He was capped by England at youth level.

Club career 
After beginning his career as an apprentice with Football League club Fulham, Metchick turned professional in 1961 and made 47 league appearances and scored 9 goals for the club. He later played for Leyton Orient, Peterborough United, Queens Park Rangers. Metchick played for North American Soccer League club Atlanta Chiefs in 1970 and returned to England to play with the reserve team at First Division club Arsenal during the 1970–71 season. Either side of a spell with Miami Gatos in 1972, Metchick made a return to Atlanta Chiefs in 1971 and 1973. Metchick returned to England in 1973 to play for Fourth Division club Brentford. After his release in 1975, Metchick wound down his career in non-League football. He returned to Brentford on a non-contract basis between January and March 1978, but did not make a first team appearance.

International career 
In 1961, Metchick won six caps and scored two goals for England Youth.

Personal life 
Metchick is Jewish and worked as a black cab driver.

Honours 
Atlanta Chiefs
 North American Soccer League Southern Division: 1971

Individual

 North American Soccer League All-Stars First Team: 1970
North American Soccer League All-Stars Second Team: 1972

Career statistics

References

External links

1943 births
Living people
English footballers
English Jews
Jewish footballers
Jewish British sportspeople
Fulham F.C. players
Leyton Orient F.C. players
Peterborough United F.C. players
Queens Park Rangers F.C. players
Arsenal F.C. players
Atlanta Chiefs players
North American Soccer League (1968–1984) players
Miami Toros players
Brentford F.C. players
Hendon F.C. players
Association football midfielders
Barnet F.C. players
Hillingdon Borough F.C. players
Woking F.C. players
Weymouth F.C. players
English Football League players
England youth international footballers
Southern Football League players
Isthmian League players
English expatriate sportspeople in the United States
Expatriate soccer players in the United States
English expatriate footballers
British taxi drivers